León Genuth (5 August 1931 – 10 March 2022) was an Argentine wrestler. He competed in the men's freestyle middleweight at the 1952 Summer Olympics.

At the 1950 Maccabiah Games in Israel, he won the middleweight wrestling gold medal. He won the gold medal in middleweight wrestling again, at the 1953 Maccabiah Games.

References

External links
 

1931 births
2022 deaths
Argentine male sport wrestlers
Maccabiah Games gold medalists for Argentina
Maccabiah Games medalists in wrestling
Competitors at the 1950 Maccabiah Games
Competitors at the 1953 Maccabiah Games
Olympic wrestlers of Argentina
People from Paraná, Entre Ríos
Wrestlers at the 1952 Summer Olympics
Wrestlers at the 1951 Pan American Games
Pan American Games gold medalists for Argentina
Pan American Games medalists in wrestling
Medalists at the 1951 Pan American Games
Sportspeople from Entre Ríos Province
20th-century Argentine people
21st-century Argentine people
Jewish wrestlers